Neysian (also Romanized as Neysīān; also known as Naistān, Neysīyān, and Neysoyān) is a village in Barzavand Rural District, in the Central District of Ardestan County, Isfahan Province, Iran. At the 2006 census, its population was 1,097, in 394 families.

References 

Populated places in Ardestan County